Red Hanrahan may refer to:

In fiction/literature:
Owen Red Hanrahan, an Irish schoolmaster/poet who figures in several poems and short stories by William Butler Yeats
Peter Red Hanrahan, a fictional character in Anne McCaffrey's Dragonsdawn novel